Kaos is an album by Swedish jazz band Bo Kaspers Orkester, released in 2001.

Track listing
"Människor som ingen vill se" (People that no one wants to see) – 5:14
"Ett fullkomligt kaos" (Complete chaos) – 3:02
"Ett ögonblick i sänder" (One moment at a time) – 3:52
"Det smartaste jag gjort" (The smartest thing I've done) – 4:07
"Kasta något tungt"  (Throw something heavy) – 4:27
"En tur på landet" (A trip to the country) – 2:57
"Det vi tycker om"  (What we like) – 4:50
"Vackert land" (Beautiful country) – 2:59
"Det är inte mig det är fel på" (It's not me that's wrong) – 3:20
"Innan klockan slagit tolv" (Before the clock struck twelve) – 2:49

Charts

Weekly charts

Year-end charts

References

2001 albums
Bo Kaspers Orkester albums